Forest Park is a suburb of Bracknell, in Berkshire, England. It and Crown Wood are in Crown Wood ward and named after the Crown Estate of Swinley Forest. It was built in the late 1980s as the town continued to expand.

Facilities include a shopping centre, community centre , The Woodcutters public house and a Tesco Express. Savernake Pond offers walking and a play area .

References

Bracknell
Suburbs in the United Kingdom
Winkfield